Christian Tappan (born 19 February 1972) is a Mexican-Colombian television actor. He is mainly recognized for his work in Mexican and Colombian soap operas and series.

Biography 
At the age of 5 he had already participated in several television commercials. His parents settled in Colombia when he was only 6 years old and later, he had a  part on the Décimo Grado series (1985).

Filmography

Film

Television roles

References

External links 
 

1972 births
21st-century Mexican male actors
Mexican male telenovela actors
Mexican male television actors
Living people
Male actors from Mexico City